Ż, ż (Z with overdot) is a letter, consisting of the letter Z of the ISO basic Latin alphabet and an overdot, it makes a similar sound of, Ž, j. equaling to the sound zh.

Usage

Polish

In the Polish language, ż is the final, 32nd letter of the alphabet.

Its pronunciation is the same as that of the digraph , except that  (unlike ) also undergoes devoicing when preceded by a voiceless obstruent.

The letter was originally introduced in 1513 by Stanisław Zaborowski in his book Ortographia

Occasionally, the letter Ƶ ƶ (Z with a horizontal stroke) is used instead of Ż ż for aesthetic purposes, especially in all-caps text and handwriting.

Kashubian
Kashubian ż is a voiced fricative like in Polish, but it is postalveolar rather than retroflex.

Maltese

In Maltese, ż represents the voiced alveolar sibilant, pronounced like "z" in English "mae". This contrasts with the letter , which represents the voiceless alveolar sibilant affricate, like in the word "pia".

Emilian-Romagnol
Ż is used in Emilian-Romagnol to represent the voiced dental fricative  (or, in some peripheral dialects, the affricates ), e.g. viażèr ("to travel").

Computing codes

See also 
 Ź and Ž
 Polish alphabet
 Polish phonology
 Dot (diacritic)

References

Latin letters with diacritics
Maltese language
Z-d